Sevvapet Road railway station is one of railway stations of Chennai Central–Arakkonam section of the Chennai Suburban Railway Network.

History
The first lines in the station were electrified on 29 November 1979, with the electrification of the Chennai Central–Tiruvallur section. An agriculture research centre was located near railway station.

Neighbourhoods
The station has two villages on either side of the railway track. The village on the northern side of the station is named Thiruvur, and the one on the other side is Thozhuvur, with chiefly agricultural fields.

See also

 Chennai Suburban Railway

References

External links
 Sevvapet Road station at Indiarailinfo.com

Stations of Chennai Suburban Railway
Railway stations in Tiruvallur district